Lying in Wait is a 2001 American direct-to-video, thriller film, starring Rutger Hauer, Virginia Madsen and Thomas Newton. It was written and directed by D. Shone Kirkpatrick.

Plot
Babee Gordon (Thomas Newton) is a quiet, introverted bachelor who one day discovers he has new next-door neighbors, Keith and Vera Miller (Rutger Hauer and Virginia Madsen).

Cast
 Rutger Hauer as Keith Miller
 Virginia Madsen as Vera Miller
 Thomas Newton as Babee Gordon
 Vanessa Dorman as El
 Ian Buchanan as George

Reception
Weird Wild Realm gave the movie a mixed review, praising Madsen and Hauer's performances and concluding: "Lying in Wait falls halfway between a conventional thriller & an arthouse film. As a low-budget straight-to-video feature it's no great shakes but it has an attractive cast. Madsen is sexy as they get in her role. Hauer's performance in such quick moments when his gaze switches from lackluster half-consciousness, to sharp knowing glance, is startling throughout". Film Totaal gave the film a 5,9 score.

References

External links
 
 

2001 films
2001 thriller films
American thriller films
2000s English-language films
2000s American films